Suzhou Jie station is a subway station on Line 10 of the Beijing Subway. It will be a transfer station between Line 10 and Line 16 when the station for Line 16 opens in late 2023.

Station Layout 
The line 10 station has 2 underground side platforms. The under construction line 16 station will have an underground island platform.

Exits 
There are 4 exits, lettered A, B, C, and D. Exit A is accessible.

References

External links

Beijing Subway stations in Haidian District